Ferry de Regt (born 29 August 1988) is a Dutch former footballer who played as a centre back.

Career
De Regt began playing for Quick Boys '31 in southern Venlo. He joined VVV-Venlo at age eleven, and broke through to the first team in 2006. His senior debut came on 15 December 2006 in a 1–0 away win against FC Den Bosch, where he came on as a substitute. De Regt gained promotion to the Eredivisie in the 2006–07 season after beating RKC Waalwijk in play-offs. His competitive debut in the Eredivisie came one year after his second division debut, on 15 December 2007 as a starter in a 1–1 draw against FC Twente.

De Regt initially started as a right-back, but began starting as a regular centre back together with Frank van Kouwen due to injuries of centre backs Reekers and Verdellen. Since then, he has been a starter in central defence for VVV.

In the 2012–13 season, De Regt plays on loan for Helmond Sport in the Eerste Divisie.

On 1 July 2019, De Regt returned to Helmond Sport on a one-year deal.

In the summer 2020, he moved to German fourth-tier Regionalliga West club Straelen.

References

External links
 
 Voetbal International profile 

Living people
1988 births
Dutch footballers
Footballers from Venlo
Association football defenders
VVV-Venlo players
Helmond Sport players
Fortuna Sittard players
TOP Oss players
SV 19 Straelen players
Eredivisie players
Eerste Divisie players
Regionalliga players
Dutch expatriate footballers
Dutch expatriate sportspeople in Germany
Expatriate footballers in Germany